You Wanted the Best, You Got the Best!! is a live compilation album released by American hard rock band Kiss. The album was issued to coincide with the group's 1996–97 Alive/Worldwide Tour. All of the songs on the album are live versions, with most taken from Alive! (1975) or Alive II (1977). Four recordings had been previously unreleased, with the liner notes stating that the tracks are outtakes from Alive! and Alive II-era recordings, although there is some speculation as to whether this is actually the case. The final track is an interview with the reunited group, conducted by Jay Leno.

Reception

The album received mixed reviews. AllMusic's Stephen Thomas Erlewine gave the album one star out of five and said, "It's a rip-off album, pure and simple... There is simply no reason for this to exist... you may have wanted the best, but you didn't get it – you just got exploited." Rolling Stone 1996 review was also negative, calling it a "shameless reunion-promotion biscuit". However, the 2004 album guide by the same magazine gave the album three stars out of five.

The album was certified gold by the RIAA on May 21, 1997.

Track listing

The Japanese CD and US vinyl releases had another live track ("New York Groove"), featuring Eric Carr on drums rather than Peter Criss, which was also released as a promotional single at Blockbuster. The track is also available on the Apple Music version of the album.

Personnel
Kiss
 Paul Stanley – rhythm guitar, vocals
 Gene Simmons – bass guitar, vocals 
 Ace Frehley – lead guitar, vocals on "New York Groove"
 Peter Criss – drums, vocals on "Beth"
 Eric Carr – drums on "New York Groove"

Charts
Album

Certifications

References

1996 live albums
Kiss (band) compilation albums
Kiss (band) live albums
Mercury Records compilation albums
1996 compilation albums